Diane is a 2017 American supernatural thriller drama directed by Michael Mongillo, who also produced the film and wrote the film's screenplay. The film stars Jason Alan Smith, Carlee Avers, Margaret Rose Champagne, and Dick Boland. It was produced by Mean Time Productions and distributed by Random Media.

The film premiered in London at the London FrightFest Film Festival on August 26, 2017. It was nominated for the 2018 Rondo Hatton Classic Horror Award for Best Independent Film.

Plot 
Steve is a wounded Afghanistan War veteran who suffers from PTSD, walks with a limp, and lives a dull, lonely life. One day, he finds the dead body of a young woman murdered with a screwdriver in his backyard. Struck by her beauty, he takes a photo of the corpse before reporting it to the authorities. Steve learns that the corpse belongs to Diane, a local singer.

He becomes the prime suspect in the investigation of her murder and is harassed by police and local townspeople who believe he is guilty. Steve becomes obsessed with Diane's image and also begins experiencing strange visions of Diane. He is visited by Diane's widower, who believes she was having an affair with him.

Steve finds himself getting stronger after his visions of Diane. Eventually, he is able to walk without a cane and is strong enough to fight his harassers in town. It is revealed that Steve and Diane were having an affair and he is being haunted by her spirit. Steve faces Diane's spirit in a final confrontation.

Cast 

 Jason Alan Smith as Steve
 Carlee Avers as Diane
 Dick Boland as Detective Bernard
 Margaret Rose Champagne as Detective Phillips
 Jim Thalman as Sergeant Winslow
 Davis Mikaels as Lenny
 Ryan Barry McCarthy as Mal
 Doug Tompos as Markus
 Kathy Searle as Sally
 Sewell Whitney as Skip

Release and distribution 
The film premiered at London FrightFest 2017. It had its United States premiere at the New York City Horror Film Festival before having a limited theatrical run in 2018, released in theaters on September 7.

The film was released on video on demand on September 17, 2018.

Reception 
On the review aggregator website Rotten Tomatoes, the film holds an approval rating of 88% with an average rating of 7.3/10 based on 8 reviews.

Frank Schek of The Hollywood Reporter gave the film a positive review, calling it "atmospheric and intriguing". Noel Murray of the Los Angeles Times wrote a more mixed review, praising the film's "strong performances and some memorably dramatic moments", but criticizing the film for lacking focus.

References 

2017 films
2017 horror films